Noasca is a comune (municipality) in the Metropolitan City of Turin in the Italian region Piedmont, located about  northwest of Turin, in the Orco Valley.

Noasca borders the following municipalities: Cogne, Valsavarenche, Locana, Ceresole Reale, Groscavallo, and Chialamberto. It is part of the Gran Paradiso National Park.

The town has become famous for the Cingino Dam, which attracts goats that climb the steep dam to lick on the salty bricks.

References

Cities and towns in Piedmont
Canavese